Ararat Samveli Mirzoyan (born 23 November 1979) is an Armenian politician currently serving as the Minister of Foreign Affairs of Armenia. Before this, he served as President of the National Assembly of Armenia from January 2019 to August 2021.

As a founding member of the Civil Contract Party, he ran under the Way Out Alliance during the 2017 parliamentary election and was elected to represent the third electoral district, consisting of the Malatia-Sebastia and Shengavit neighbourhoods of Yerevan.

Professional career 
Prior to running as a political candidate, Mirzoyan worked at a number of employers in Armenia, including the Armenian Genocide Museum-Institute, HSBC Bank Armenia, REGNUM News Agency, and the International Foundation for Electoral Systems.

In early 2021, a handwritten letter was made public by Mikayel Minasyan, son-in-law of former president Serzh Sargsyan, wherein Mirzoyan agrees to be an agent for Armenia's National Security Service (NSS). Minasyan claimed that the agreement was made under pressure after it was discovered Mirzoyan was spying for Turkey. Both Mirzoyan and the NSS initially denied the authenticity of the letter; however, Mirzoyan eventually admitted the letter's authenticity, while denying that he was ever a spy for Turkey.

Political career 
A strong opponent of Serzh Sargsyan, Mirzoyan was instrumental in the 2018 Armenian Velvet Revolution against Sargsyan's transition from President to Prime Minister. Notably, on 11 April 2018, he lit smoke flares during a speech in the National Assembly to call attention to the planned protests, which eventually did result in Sargsyan's resignation.

In May 2018, after Nikol Pashinyan replaced Sargsyan as Prime Minister, Mirzoyan was appointed as First Deputy Prime Minister under the new administration, For which he had to give up his seat in parliament. In January 2019 Mirzoyan was elected President of the National Assembly of Armenia, a position he held until August 2021. On 19 August 2021, he was appointed Minister of Foreign Affairs.

Personal life 
He is married and has two children. He holds a Certificate of Merit from the Ministry of Education of Armenia (awarded in 2016).

2020 beating 
On the morning of 10 November 2020, protesters seized the parliament building and pulled Mirzoyan from a car, demanding to know the whereabouts of Prime Minister Nikol Pashinyan, who announced a peace treaty with Azerbaijan just hours earlier to end the Nagorno-Karabakh War. In the presence of his child, Mirzoyan was beaten by a mob and was later taken to hospital, where he underwent surgery and was said to be in a good condition.

See also 
 Foreign relations of Armenia

References 

1979 births
Living people
Deputy Prime Ministers of Armenia
Yerevan State University alumni
Presidents of the National Assembly (Armenia)
Members of the 7th convocation of the National Assembly (Armenia)
Civil Contract (Armenia) politicians
Foreign ministers of Armenia